Don Wilbanks (born Thomas Donald Wilbanks, October 4, 1926 – July 26, 2013) was an American actor who appeared in such television series as Rawhide, Tate, Twilight Zone, Tales of Wells Fargo, Laramie, Bat Masterson,  The Life and Legend of Wyatt Earp, Bonanza, Cheyenne, Convoy, Rango,Mayberry R.F.D., The Guns of Will Sonnett , 77 Sunset Strip, Ironside, Mod Squad, Lancer, The Virginian (one of which was in 1970 when he appeared as Meyers on The Men From Shiloh, which was the rebranded name that year for The Virginian), Charlie's Angels, and Lawman, among others.

Wilbanks was born in Holdenville, Oklahoma, and moved to California to live with his mother when his father was called to active duty at the outbreak of World War II (1939). After the war, he attended Montana State University, where he was a star on the football field. After being invited to join an amateur theater group in San Diego (Drury Lane Theater), he decided to leave his successful service station business, and moved to North Hollywood in 1955 with his young family to start his professional acting career. Wilbanks was first cast as an extra in several movies and television shows. His first credited role came in the 1958 episode of Tales of Wells Fargo titled "The Sooners". Additional roles came in mostly other Western TV shows throughout the 1960s.

Wilbanks died on July 26, 2013.

References

External links 

1926 births
2013 deaths
Male actors from Oklahoma